Hello Destroyer is a 2016 Canadian drama film written and directed by Kevan Funk. It had its world premiere in the Discovery section at the 2016 Toronto International Film Festival.

The film stars Jared Abrahamson as an enforcer on a hockey team who faces difficult consequences when a hit on an opposing player during a game turns more violent than intended. It was nominated for four Canadian Screen Awards, including Best Motion Picture.

Cast
 Jared Abrahamson as Tyson Burr
 Kurt Max Runte as Coach Dale Milbury
 Joe Buffalo as Eric
 Paul McGillion as Ron Burr
 Sara Canning as Wendy Davis

Production
The film was an expansion of his 2013 short film Destroyer.

According to Funk, his intention was to make a film that explored institutional and systemic violence rather than a sports film per se; he chose a hockey-related setting as it represented an "aggressively Canadian" cultural institution which has a complex relationship with violence and toxic masculinity, and has stated that if he were making the same film in the United States he would likely have chosen a military setting.

The film was shot primarily in Prince George, British Columbia, including at the CN Centre.

Reception
On review aggregator website Rotten Tomatoes, the film holds an approval rating of 100% based on 11 reviews. Vice Sports describes the film as "about how violence is cultivated, showcased and then punished within a set of institutions that require its presence to be profitable", and Alex Rose of the magazine Cult MTL called the film "as Canadian as a Weakerthans song and as depressing as that second Leonard Cohen record."

On 7 December 2016, the film was named to the Toronto International Film Festival's annual Canada's Top 10 list.

Accolades
The film received four Canadian Screen Award nominations at the 5th Canadian Screen Awards in 2017, including Best Motion Picture and Best Actor (Abrahamson).

References

External links
 Official website (archive)
 

2016 films
2016 drama films
Canadian drama films
Canadian ice hockey films
English-language Canadian films
Films set in British Columbia
Films shot in British Columbia
Films directed by Kevan Funk
2010s English-language films
2010s Canadian films